Assholes Finish First is a book by Tucker Max, detailing anecdotal stories, usually revolving around drinking and sex. It is the sequel to I Hope They Serve Beer in Hell.  The title is a parody of and corollary to the saying "Nice guys finish last," a frequent misquotation of Leo Durocher's statement "Nice guys; finish last," which was itself a 1975 misquotation by Durocher of his statement 29 years earlier about the 1946 baseball New York Giants.

The book debuted at Number 3 on The New York Times Best Seller list for hardcover nonfiction on October 17, 2010, and remained on the list for 14 consecutive weeks.

Assholes Finish First was released in paperback on October 18, 2011.

References

2010 non-fiction books
Fratire books